The 2018 United States House of Representatives elections in Idaho were held on Tuesday, November 6, 2018, to elect the two U.S. representatives from the U.S. state of Idaho; one from each of the state's two congressional districts. Primaries were held on May 15, 2018. The elections and primaries coincided with the elections and primaries of other federal and state offices.

Overview
Results of the 2018 United States House of Representatives elections in Idaho by district:

District 1

The incumbent was Republican Raúl Labrador, who had represented the district since 2011 and was reelected with 68% of the vote in 2016. He retired to unsuccessfully run in the 2018 Republican gubernatorial primary.

Democratic primary
 Cristina McNeil, real estate agent, chair of the Latino caucus of the Idaho Democratic Party
 Michael Smith, former U.S. Marine
 James Vandermaas, former U.S. Marine

Primary results

Republican primary
 Russ Fulcher, former state senator
 Alex Gallegos, retired U.S. Army lieutenant colonel
 Nick Henderson
 David H. Leroy, former Lieutenant Governor of Idaho
 Luke Malek, state representative
 Christy Perry, state representative
 Michael Snyder, author

Primary results

General election

Polling

Results

District 2

The incumbent is Republican Mike Simpson, who has represented the district since 1999. He was reelected with 63% of the vote in 2016.

Democratic primary
 Peter Rickards
 Aaron Swisher, businessman

Primary results

Republican primary
 Mike Simpson, incumbent

Primary results

General election

Polling

Results

References

External links
Candidates at Vote Smart 
Candidates at Ballotpedia 
Campaign finance at FEC 
Campaign finance at OpenSecrets

Official campaign websites for first district candidates
Cristina McNeil (D) for Congress
Russ Fulcher (R) for Congress

Official campaign websites for second district candidates
Aaron Swisher (D) for Congress
Mike Simpson (R) for Congress

Idaho
2018
United States House of Representatives